Ivan Nagler (born 30 January 1999) is an Italian luger. He competed in the men's doubles event at the 2018 Winter Olympics. Nagler is an athlete of the Centro Sportivo Carabinieri.

References

External links
 

1999 births
Living people
Italian male lugers
Olympic lugers of Italy
Lugers at the 2018 Winter Olympics
Place of birth missing (living people)
Sportspeople from Bruneck
Lugers of Centro Sportivo Carabinieri
Lugers at the 2016 Winter Youth Olympics